R. Manimaran is an Indian politician and former Member of the Legislative Assembly of Tamil Nadu. He was elected to the Tamil Nadu legislative assembly as an All India Anna Dravida Munnetra Kazhagam candidate from Tiruppur constituency in 1977, and 1980 elections.

References 

All India Anna Dravida Munnetra Kazhagam politicians
Living people
Members of the Tamil Nadu Legislative Assembly
Year of birth missing (living people)